The 1969 German Grand Prix was a Formula One motor race held at Nürburgring on 3 August 1969. It was race 7 of 11 in both the 1969 World Championship of Drivers and the 1969 International Cup for Formula One Manufacturers. Twelve Formula Two cars were also entered into the race, though they were not eligible to score points.

The 14-lap race was won by Belgian driver Jacky Ickx, driving a works Brabham-Ford. Ickx took pole position, led the final eight laps and set the fastest lap of the race. Scotland's Jackie Stewart finished second in a Matra-Ford, with New Zealand's Bruce McLaren third in a McLaren-Ford.

Report

Gerhard Mitter was killed during a practice session for this race at Schwedenkreuz. He was practicing for BMW's 269 F2 project. As a suspension or steering failure was suspected, the BMW team with Hubert Hahne and Dieter Quester withdrew from the race, as did Mitter's teammate at Porsche, Hans Herrmann.

Mario Andretti drove the 4WD Lotus 63 for very few laps in practice. The heavy fuel load for the race made the car ground out in lap 1 after a jump at Wippermann, causing a crash that also took out Vic Elford, whose car flipped upside down and landed in the trees. Elford broke his arm in 3 places.

In the race, Jacky Ickx had a very poor start which dropped him down to 9th, but he eventually passed the entire field over 3 laps, and he and Jackie Stewart battled for 4 laps until Ickx passed Stewart at the first corner, the Südkehre. Stewart held on but then gearbox problems began to slow him and he dropped away, leaving Ickx in a dominant position.  Piers Courage had an accident at Breidscheid when he slipped on some oil and crashed into a ditch next to the Adenauer bridge. Luckily, he was unhurt.

This was the last Formula One race at the Nürburgring before it was rebuilt and fitted with Armco barriers for the 1971 race.

Classification

Qualifying

Race 

Formula Two entrants are denoted by a pink background. They were not eligible for World Championship points.

Championship standings after the race

Drivers' Championship standings

Constructors' Championship standings

References

Further reading

External links

German Grand Prix
German Grand Prix
German Grand Prix
German Grand Prix